Nikita Mikhailovich Yefremov (born 30 May 1988) is a Russian theatre actor, voice acting and dubbing actor, known for his roles in television series Londongrad (2015), The Thaw (2013) and in the film Cinderella (2012). He is a son of Mikhail Yefremov and a grandson of Oleg Yefremov.

Biography
Nikita Yefremov was born in Moscow, Russian SFSR, Soviet Union. Nikita studied at the Physics and Mathematics Gymnasium, Gymnasium No. 1514 – Moscow Secondary School No. 52, and initially did not plan on becoming an actor, although he always participated in school plays. He graduated from the music school in violin, studied singing and also played the piano.

In 2005, he entered the Moscow Art Theater School, where he studied at Konstantin Raikin's course. During his studies he proved himself on the student stage and became the winner of the theater prize "Golden leaf 2009" in the nomination "Best male role" for the role of Chatsky in his theatrical performance Woe from Wit, directed by Viktor Ryzhakov. All the roles in the play were performed by the graduates of the acting course of Konstantin Raikin.

In 2009, Nikita Yefremov, a graduate of the Moscow Art Theatre School-Studio, was invited to several leading Moscow theaters. Of all the proposals, Nikita chose the Sovremennik Theatre, which was founded by his grandfather. His debut in this theater was the role of Gottfried Lenz in the play Three Comrades (the actor was introduced to the play on 1 October 2009, the day of the double anniversary of the performance (exactly 10 years ago the premiere took place and on this day the actors performed the play for the three hundredth time).

Filmography

References

External links
 

1988 births
Living people
Russian male film actors
Russian male television actors
Russian male stage actors
Russian male voice actors
21st-century Russian male actors
Male actors from Moscow
Moscow Art Theatre School alumni